Georgia participated in the Junior Eurovision Song Contest 2014 which took place on 15 November 2014, in Marsa, Malta. Georgian Public Broadcaster (GPB) was responsible for organising their entry for the contest. Lizi Pop was internally selected to represent Georgia in the contest with the song "Happy Day".

Background

Before Junior Eurovision
Like Georgia has done most years since their début in the contest, the Georgian broadcaster GPB decided to internally select their 2014 artist after holding an open audition. It was originally announced on 14 August 2014 that Liza Japaridze, Sofi Dashniani, and Dea Dashniani would represent Georgia as a trio, however on 16 August 2014 it was revealed that Japaridze would perform under the stage name Lizi Pop, while the Dashnianis will be backing singers.

Artist and song information

Lizi Pop

Lizi Pop is a Georgian child singer. She represented Georgia in the Junior Eurovision Song Contest 2014 in Marsa, Malta, on 15 November 2014 with the song "Happy Day", placing eleventh out of sixteen entries.

Happy Day

"Happy Day" is a song by Georgian child singer Lizi Pop. It represented Georgia during the Junior Eurovision Song Contest 2014. It is composed and written by Giorgi Kukhianidze.

At Junior Eurovision 
At the running order draw which took place on 9 November 2014, Georgia were drawn to perform sixth on 15 November 2014, following  and preceding .

Final
Lizi Pop performed with four background dancers in black outfits with white wigs. During the performance, Lizi Pop encouraged the members of the audience to sing along.

At the end of the voting, Georgia placed 11th with 54 points.

Voting

Detailed voting results
The following members comprised the Georgian jury:
 Chabuki Amiranashvili
 Archil Nijardze
 Sopho Gelovani
 Mariam Ebralidze
 Lasha Kapanadze

Notes

References

Junior Eurovision Song Contest
Georgia (country)
2014